The Fornădia is a right tributary of the river Căian in Romania. It flows into the Căian near Bejan.

References

Rivers of Hunedoara County
Rivers of Romania